Thomas Beach Alter (22 June 1950 – 29 September 2017) was an Indian actor. He was best known for his works in Hindi cinema, and Indian theatre. In 2008, he was awarded the Padma Shri by the Government of India.

Early life
Born in Mussoorie in present-day Uttarakhand, Alter was the son of American Presbyterian missionaries of English, Scottish and Swiss German ancestry and lived for years in Mumbai and the Himalayan hill station of Landour. His grandparents migrated to Madras, India from Ohio, U.S., in November 1916. From there, they moved to and settled in Lahore, in present-day Pakistan. His father was born in Sialkot. After the Partition of India, Alter's family too split into two; his grandparents chose to stay in Pakistan while his parents moved to India. After living in Allahabad, Jabalpur and Saharanpur, in 1954 they finally settled in Rajpur, Uttarakhand, then a small town located between Dehradun and Mussoorie; Rajpur is now considered a suburb of Dehradun. Alter's siblings are older sister Martha Chen, who teaches at Harvard University and brother John, a poet. Author Stephen Alter is a first cousin.

As a child, Alter studied Hindi among other subjects in Mussoorie. Consequently, he came to be occasionally referred to as the "Blue-eyed saheb with impeccable Hindi." He was educated in Mussoorie's Woodstock School. At 18, Alter left for the U.S. for higher education and studied at Yale University for a year before returning to India upon losing interest in studies. The following year, he obtained work as a teacher at St. Thomas School, Jagadhri, in Haryana. He worked there for six months, simultaneously coaching his students in cricket. Over the next two and a half years, Alter worked several jobs, teaching for a while at Woodstock School, Mussoorie, and working at a hospital in the U.S., and returning to India before continuing to work at Jagadhri. At Jagadhri, he began to watch Hindi films. It was during this time that he saw the Hindi film Aradhana, which proved to be a turning point in his career and drifted towards a career in acting, inspired by the lead actor Rajesh Khanna. He headed to Film and Television Institute of India (FTII) in Pune, where he studied acting from 1972 to 1974 under Roshan Taneja. In a 2017 interview, he recalled, "I came to Mumbai to become Rajesh Khanna; didn't come to act on stage."

Career

Film
After graduating from FTII, Alter headed straight to Mumbai (Formerly called as Bombay) and soon got his first break in the Dev Anand starrer Saheb Bahadur (1977), directed by Chetan Anand. However, his first release was Ramanand Sagar's Charas. This was followed by roles in Des Pardes, Ram Bharose, Hum Kisise Kum Nahin and Parvarish. He dubbed for actor Jeevan for the innocent person of the twin roles played by Jeevan in the film Amar Akbar Anthony.

Alter was fluent in Hindi and Urdu, and was knowledgeable about Indian culture. He could also read Urdu and was fond of Shayari. He worked for noted filmmakers like Satyajit Ray in Shatranj Ke Khilari and is remembered for his role as a British officer in Kranti. He got the opportunity to act with his idol Rajesh Khanna in the film Naukri, directed by Hrishikesh Mukherjee in 1978 and later in Chetan Anand's Kudrat. In Sardar, the 1993 film biography of Indian leader Sardar Patel, which focused on the events surrounding the partition and independence of India, Alter portrayed Lord Mountbatten of Burma. He also acted in the Hollywood movie One Night with the King with Peter O'Toole.

In 1996 he appeared in the Assamese film Adajya, and in 2007 acted in William Dalrymple's City of Djinns alongside Zohra Sehgal and Manish Joshi Bismil. He also appeared in the solo play Maulana and the film Ocean of An Old Man.

Alter played the role of a doctor in Bheja Fry, a comedy movie starring Rajat Kapoor.

In April 2011 he acted in a short film Yours, Maria directed by Chirag Vadgama, playing the lead role of Matthew Chacha in the movie.

Alter lent his voice for the authorized audio autobiography of Dr. Verghese Kurien, titled The Man Who Made The Elephant Dance, which was released in 2012.

Some of his most famous movie roles have been as Musa in Vidhu Vinod Chopra's acclaimed crime drama Parinda, Mahesh Bhatt's blockbuster romance Aashiqui, and Ketan Mehta's Sardar, in which Alter essayed the role of Lord Mountbatten.

His last film was Hamari Paltan (2018).

Television
Alter appeared in much Indian television series, including Samvidhaan, all of which were praised by the audience for his acting. In Zabaan Sambhalke he played the role of a British writer, Charles Spencers, who lives in India and wants to learn the Hindi language. He acted in the TV series Khamosh Sa Afsana (as a Husain Baba), telecast on Doordarshan in 2014–15. In November 2014, he played Sahir Ludhianvi in a stage production based on the life and work of the famous Urdu poet and film lyricist. He also played a schoolteacher in Yahan Ke Hum Sikandar. Alter has worked as the red robe guru in Mukesh Khanna's TV production Shaktimaan (1998–2002). Also, he appeared in Contiloe & Cinevistaas show Ssshhhh...Koi Hai in 2002-03. He played Indian characters in Indian television series, such as the long-running Junoon, in which he was the sadistic mob lord Keshav Kalsi. He anchored "Adabi Cocktail" in 2000 telecast on Urdu Television Network and interviewed Johny Walker, Naushad, TunTun, Hasan Kamaal, Adnan Sami, Jagdeep, Naqsh layalpuri and many more.

Theatre

Alter was also a stage actor. In 1977, he, Naseeruddin Shah, and Benjamin Gilani formed a theatre group called Motley Productions. Their first play was Samuel Beckett's play Waiting for Godot, which was staged at Prithvi Theatre, Bombay, on 29 July 1979. He went on to appear in many other plays at the theatre, including an adaptation of Vaikom Muhammad Basheer's My Grandad Had an Elephant which was performed on 7 June 2011. He has also worked with the New Delhi theatre group Pierrot's Troupe.

In the early 2000s, he played the Indian independence activist Maulana Azad in a one-man Urdu-language play.

In Ghalib In Delhi, he played the role of Urdu poet Mirza Ghalib.

He was the lead actor in "Once Upon A Time", a collection of five short stories presented as vignettes, directed by Sujata Soni Bali and co-starring prominent stage actor and TV personality Sunit Tandon. The production was last staged in Mumbai on 17 June 2017.

Writing and journalism
Alter has written books including The Longest Race, Rerun at Rialto, and The Best in the World. He was also a sports journalist with a special interest in cricket, a game on which he has written extensively in publications such as Sportsweek, Outlook, Cricket Talk, Sunday Observer, Firstpost, Citizen, and Debonair. He played cricket for a film industry team MCC (Match Cut Club), which includes Naseeruddin Shah, Satish Shah, Vishal Bhardwaj, Aamir Khan, Nana Patekar, Bhupinder Singh and Amarinder Sangha. He also wrote on cricket in Indian publications. In 1996, he was invited by friend Siraj Syed to Singapore, to do cricket commentary in Hindi, for Indian viewers, on the sports TV channel, ESPN. 
In addition to acting, Alter also ventured into a direction - he directed a one-shot episode for the short-lived series Yule Love Stories in the mid-1990s - and was a sports journalist in the late 1980s to early 1990s. He has written three books: one non-fiction, and two fiction. Before his sudden death, Alter had just announced his inaugural feature film as a director called Rerun at Rialto, which was based on the book written by him.

Personal life
Alter married Carol Evans, a fellow Woodstock School student, in 1977. The marriage produced two children: son Jamie and daughter Afshaan. Jamie has worked as a cricket writer for ESPNcricinfo and CricBuzz, and was also the sports editor of The Times of India. As a cricket enthusiast himself, Tom wrote columns for newspapers and journals for over ten years. He also worked as a journalist during the time and was the first to video interview Indian cricketer Sachin Tendulkar in 1988.

In September 2017, Alter was diagnosed with stage IV skin cancer (squamous cell carcinoma). His thumb had been amputated a year earlier because of the condition. He died on 29 September at his residence in Mumbai. A statement released on behalf of his family read: "It is with sadness we announce the death of our beloved Tom Alter, actor, writer, director, Padma Shri, and our dear husband and father. Tom passed away Friday night at home with his family and close family members in attendance."

Filmography

Film

TV series

References

External links
 

1950 births
2017 deaths
Indian male film actors
Indian male stage actors
Indian male television actors
Assamese-language actors
Indian Presbyterians
Indian people of American descent
People from Mussoorie
Male actors from Mumbai
Male actors in Hindi cinema
Film and Television Institute of India alumni
Recipients of the Padma Shri in arts
Male actors in Gujarati-language films
Indian people of English descent
Indian people of Scottish descent
Indian people of Swiss descent
Indian people of German descent
Indian people of Swiss-German descent
Male actors in Malayalam cinema
Male actors in Kannada cinema
Deaths from cancer in India
Indian amputees